Mariano Gabriel Lombardi (born 19 August 1968, in Buenos Aires) is a former Argentine rugby union player. He played as a Second Row.

He played for Asociación Alumni in the Nacional de Clubes.

He was called for Argentina for the 1991 Rugby World Cup, but would be the only player never to be capped by the "Pumas".

References

External links
Mariano Lombardi at ESPN

1968 births
Argentine rugby union players
Asociación Alumni players
Rugby union players from Buenos Aires
Living people